Lucia Hrivnák Klocová (born 20 November 1983 in Martin) is a Slovak middle distance athlete, who specialises in the 800 metres and 1500 metres. She represented Slovakia at the 2004, 2008 and 2012 Olympic Games. She has also reached the semi-finals of the World Championships in Athletics on five occasions.

Biography

Junior Career
She was a highly successful junior athlete, winning the bronze medal at the 2000 World Junior Championships and then going on to become the 2001 European Junior Champion. The following year she improved one place on the global stage, taking a silver medal at the  2002 World Junior Championships. Stepping up an age level, she won the silver at the 2003 European Athletics U23 Championships.

Senior Career
She set a personal best in the 800 m at the 2008 Meeting Gaz de France in Paris. Her time of 1:58.51 was a step towards Gabriela Sedláková's Slovakian record of 1:58.37, but it was overshadowed by Pamela Jelimo's African record run.

Klocová reached her first senior final at the 2010 European Athletics Championships where she finished fourth in the women's 800 m. She was later awarded the bronze medal, after the disqualification of Mariya Savinova. She broke Andrea Sollarova's seventeen-year-old national record over 1500 metres at the Athletics Bridge meet in Dubnica later that year. Her time of 4:08.86 was enough for second place behind Olympic finalist Anna Mishchenko, who set a meet record. 
At the 2012 Summer Olympics, she reached the 1500 m final, finishing in fifth place.

Coach
She is coached by Pavel Slouka and her club is AK ZTS Martin, where she returned after 8 years spent in Slávia UK Bratislava.

Competition record

References

External links
 Official website 
 
 Lucia Hrivnák Klocová at the Slovenský Olympijský Výbor 
 

1983 births
Living people
Slovak female middle-distance runners
Athletes (track and field) at the 2004 Summer Olympics
Athletes (track and field) at the 2008 Summer Olympics
Athletes (track and field) at the 2012 Summer Olympics
Athletes (track and field) at the 2016 Summer Olympics
Olympic athletes of Slovakia
World Athletics Championships athletes for Slovakia
Sportspeople from Martin, Slovakia